Rupali Krishnarao (Roopali Krishnarao), is an Indian actress, known for her role in Koyelaanchal (2014).

References

External links

 
 

Living people
Year of birth missing (living people)
Place of birth missing (living people)
Indian film actresses
Actresses in Hindi cinema
21st-century Indian actresses